Mwadingusha Airport  is an airstrip serving the city of Mwadingusha in Haut-Katanga Province, Democratic Republic of the Congo. Aerial images of the runway show little sign of recent use.

See also

Transport in the Democratic Republic of the Congo
List of airports in the Democratic Republic of the Congo

References

External links
 HERE Maps - Mwadingusha
 OpenStreetMap - Mwadingusha
 OurAirports - Mwadingusha
 FallingRain - Mwadingusha

Airports in Haut-Katanga Province